Nyelâyu (Yâlayu), also known as Nyalâyu, is a Kanak language of northern New Caledonia, spoken by approximately 2,000 speakers. There are two dialects that are not mutually intelligible. Pooc (or Haat) is spoken in the Belep islands, which are located just north of Grande Terre. Puma (or Paak or Ovac) is spoken in the northernmost regions of New Caledonia in the areas around Poum in the west and Pouébo and Balade in the east.

Phonology

Consonants 

Voiceless stops, nasals, and approximants exhibit a contrast of aspiration exhibited in the following examples.

 pe [pe] "ray fish" || phe [pʰe] "sharpening stone"
 teec [teec] "scorching" || theec [tʰeec] "washed up"
 nu [nu] "coconut palm" || nhu [nʰu] "hot"

Aspirated consonants are very subtly marked. Aspiration seems to be a prosodic trait that affects the overall realization of the syllable by lowering the register of the voice.

Vowels 

The vowels /y/ and /ø/ are in parentheses, because they are very rare and appear only in a few words.

Notes

References
 
 
 

New Caledonian languages
Languages of New Caledonia